The idea of human geography originated rather early in China, about 2,000 years ago. The classical works of philosophy and history contained much of the concept of the relationship between human activities and "Tian" (the heaven) or "Di" (the earth), recognizing that both sides were now and then in harmonious state or in contradictory condition, and both sides had their own evolutionary laws.

See also

 Geography of China
 Chinese historiography
 China Historical Geographic Information System

Further reading
 Wu Chuan-jun. "The progress of human geography in China: Its achievements and experiences" GeoJournal Volume 21, Numbers 1–2 / March, 1990
 Yue-man Yeung and Yixing Zhou. Human geography in China: evolution, rejuvenation and prospect. Progress in Human Geography 15,4 (1991) pp. 373–394
 Tao-Chang Chiang. "Historical geography in China" Progress in Human Geography, Vol. 29, No. 2, 148–164 (2005)

External links
 China, the Land and the People: A Human Geography by L. H. Dudley Buxton. 333 pgs.

Geographic history of China
Human geography